is a passenger railway station located in the city of Zama, Kanagawa, Japan, and operated by the private railway operator Odakyu Electric Railway.

Lines

Station layout
The station consists of two side platforms serving two tracks, connected to the station building by footbridges. The station building is elevated, and is located above the tracks and platforms.

Platforms

History
It was renamed  on 1 July 1937, and on 15 October 1941, it was renamed Zama Station.

Station numbering was introduced in January 2014 with Zama being assigned station number OH31.

Passenger statistics
In fiscal 2019, the station was used by an average of 20,833 passengers daily.

The passenger figures for previous years are as shown below.

Surrounding area

West Entrance
 Hoshigaya Temple
 Nashi-no-ki ruins
 Suzukamyō Shrine
 Iriya Elementary School
 Zama High School
 Zama Special School
 JA Sagami Zama
 Uni Zama store (department store)
 Zama Police station
 Iriya Station (JR Sagami Line)

East Entrance
 Odakyu OX
 Yatoyama Park
 Zama Station Post office

Buses

West Entrance
Services are operated by Kanagawa Chuo Transportation and Zama Community Bus.
<Iriya Route> City Office branch (ZCB)
<Iriya Route> Main City Office (ZCB)
<Ebina 10> Ebina Station East Entrance (Kanachu)
<Ebina 10> Sobudai-mae Station (via Tatsunodai) (Kanachu)

East Entrance
Services are operated by Kanagawa Chuo Transportation.
<Sobudaishita 02> Sobudai-shita Station
<Sobudai 04> Zama-Yotsuya
<Sobudai 04, Ebina 10> Sobudai-mae Station (via Tatsunodai)
<Sobudaishita 02> Sagamino Station North Entrance (via Tatsunodai)

See also
 List of railway stations in Japan

References

External links

Odakyu station information 

Railway stations in Japan opened in 1927
Odakyu Odawara Line
Railway stations in Kanagawa Prefecture
Zama, Kanagawa